Pimpalwadi is a village in Rahata taluka of Ahmednagar district in state of Maharashtra, This village famous for so many Brisk factories.
Pimpalwadi village has two schools, Z.P. Govt. Primary School and CSMV Senior Secondary school. For upper education students have to go Shirdi, Kopargaon, Rahata or loni. Out of Maharashtra  Largest brisk supplier live in this village. Yearly turn over is near about 5-6 Cr rupis.

Demographics
The population of Pimpalwadi is 4,034 of which males are 2,129 and females are 1,905. Village is 5 km from Shirdi the holy Saibaba city. Most of the villagers goes to Shirdi for earning daily wage.

See also
List of villages in Rahata taluka

References

Villages in Ahmednagar district